Erind Prifti (born 27 May 1991) is a Greek-born Albanian professional footballer who plays as a goalkeeper for Super League 2 club Apollon Larissa.

Club career
Prifti played for AEL's U-21 team from 2007 to 2010. In the summer of 2010 he signed a 5-years contract and moved to the first squad. Since then, he managed to play only one game in the 2011–12 Football League against Fokikos.On 30 January 2013 he was given on loan to AEP Paphos till the end of the season.

On 15 September 2019 it was confirmed, that Prifti had joined Diagoras Stefanovikeiou.

International career
In January 2010 Prifti was screened by Albania under-21.

References

External links
AEL1964.gr profile 
Loan To AEP PAPHOS

1991 births
Living people
Footballers from Larissa
Greek people of Albanian descent
Association football goalkeepers
Greek footballers
Albanian footballers
Athlitiki Enosi Larissa F.C. players
AEP Paphos FC players
AO Chania F.C. players
Anagennisi Karditsa F.C. players
Cypriot First Division players
Albanian expatriate footballers
Expatriate footballers in Cyprus
Albanian expatriate sportspeople in Cyprus